The United States city of Seattle has been the site of occasional, small-scale terrorist incidents. Though several locations in the city have been discovered on target lists of known terrorist cells, as of 2014 the city's Office of Emergency Management believed that a "large-scale attack seems like a low probability event". A 2006 report by the United States Department of Justice indicated that the Washington State Ferries, which have several facilities in Seattle, was the leading "target for maritime terrorism in this country".

List of terrorist incidents

Terrorist incidents in fiction
 The 2001 film Greenmail involves a radical environmentalist bombing locations in Seattle.
 An episode of the television series Reaper, set in Seattle, has presidential assassin Leon Czolgosz escape from Hell.
 In a 2014 episode of the TV series Grey's Anatomy, a reported terrorist attack against a Seattle shopping mall turns out to be a gas main explosion.
 In the 2016 TV series Shooter, the President of Ukraine is assassinated while visiting Seattle.

See also
 2006 Seattle Jewish Federation shooting
 List of terrorist incidents in New York City
 Seattle Police Department

References

History of Seattle
Lists of terrorist incidents in the United States